West Deer Township is a township in Allegheny County, Pennsylvania, United States. The population was 11,771 at the 2010 census.

History
In 1788, the Pennsylvania Legislature created Allegheny County from some of Westmoreland and Washington counties and most of the Depreciation Lands north of the Ohio River and west of the Allegheny River. The county was expanded a year later. Of the county's then seven townships, Pitt Township comprised most of the northern part of the county. It is this township that would be divided in 1796 to form Pine and Deer townships. Deer Township was made up of what is today the eastern parts of Richland and West Deer, Frazer, most of East Deer, part of Hampton, and all of Fawn and Harrison. Deer gets its name from Chief Deer, a sub-chief of Iroquois leader Guyasuta. Half of Deer Township was used to create Indiana Township in 1805. In 1836, upon petition of its citizens, Deer was divided into East Deer and West Deer. In 1860, the western boundary of West Deer was moved eastward, the land being used to form Richland Township. In 1861, part of the southwestern corner of West Deer was used to form Hampton Township. West Deer also annexed land along it southern border from Indiana Township in this exchange. Historically, much of West Deer's economy has been based on farming and coal mining. Many coal towns such as Curtisville, Bairdford, and Russellton were dominant forces in the industry. In recent years, significant suburban growth has occurred in the southwestern and central portions of the township, while other portions have remained rural.

Geography
According to the United States Census Bureau, the township has a total area of 29.0 square miles (75.1 km), all  land.

Streams
Deer Creek flows through the township.

The township contains the following communities: Allegheny Acres, Bairdford, Benjamin, Blanchard, Culmerville, Curtisville, Fawn Haven, Magill Heights, Red Hot, and Russellton.

Demographics

As of the census of 2000, there were 11,563 people, 4,378 households, and 3,349 families residing in the township.  The population density was 399.0 people per square mile (154.1/km).  There were 4,584 housing units at an average density of 158.2 per square mile (61.1/km).  The racial makeup of the township was 98.94% White, 0.29% African American, 0.11% Native American, 0.22% Asian, 0.10% from other races, and 0.35% from two or more races. Hispanic or Latino of any race were 0.42% of the population.

There were 4,378 households, out of which 35.0% had children under the age of 18 living with them, 64.3% were married couples living together, 8.7% had a female householder with no husband present, and 23.5% were non-families. 20.4% of all households were made up of individuals, and 9.5% had someone living alone who was 65 years of age or older.  The average household size was 2.62 and the average family size was 3.04.

In the township the population was spread out, with 25.0% under the age of 18, 5.7% from 18 to 24, 31.3% from 25 to 44, 23.8% from 45 to 64, and 14.2% who were 65 years of age or older.  The median age was 39 years. For every 100 females, there were 95.3 males.  For every 100 females age 18 and over, there were 93.1 males.

The median income for a household in the township was $46,370, and the median income for a family was $52,295. Males had a median income of $40,824 versus $26,032 for females. The per capita income for the township was $20,358.  About 4.5% of families and 6.3% of the population were below the poverty line, including 7.6% of those under age 18 and 6.6% of those age 65 or over.

Government and Politics

References

External links

West Deer Township official website

Pittsburgh metropolitan area
Townships in Allegheny County, Pennsylvania
Townships in Pennsylvania